James William Carruthers (5 July 1929 – 15 August 1990) was an Australian boxer, who became world champion in the bantamweight division.

Jimmy was the 2009 Inductee for the Australian National Boxing Hall of Fame Veterans category.

Amateur career
Carruthers's boxing career started as an Australian representative at the 1948 Summer Olympics in London.  In his first-round match of the bantamweight competition, he fought Fred Daigle of Canada and won on points. He defeated Arnoldo Parés of Argentina in his second match. However, he had sustained an eye injury during his bout with Parés, and had to withdraw from the quarter-final match with the eventual gold medalist Tibor Csík of Hungary.

Professional career
Carruthers joined the professional ranks in 1950, and was an immediate success. By then, he was being managed by Dr. Jim McGirr, and trained by "Silent" Bill McConnell.

He won the Australian Bantamweight title in 1951 and then the British Commonwealth and Bantamweight Championship of the  World the following year. Carruthers became Australia's first universally recognised boxing World Champion. Great Australians of the past—including Young Griffo, Mick King, and Les Darcy—had all won world titles, but they had not received international acceptance at the time of winning their respective crowns.  After defending his newly won World bantamweight title against Vic Toweel in Johannesburg, and then against the American Henry "Pappy" Gault in Sydney, it was found that Carruthers was carrying a 30-foot-long tapeworm.

He was matched for a world title bout against the New Zealand Bantamweight Champion Lyn Philp. For unclear reasons the fight never went ahead.

After a non-title bout in Sydney, and a further title defence against Chamroen Songkitrat in Bangkok, Carruthers retired on 16 May 1954.  Among the fighters he defeated were South African Vic Toweel (twice); Pappy Gault; Bobby Sinn and Chamroen Songkitrat. He made a brief comeback in Melbourne and Sydney in the early sixties in non-title fights, with his last fight in Wellington New Zealand in 1962 where he lost to Jimmy Cassidy.

Personal
He worked on the Sydney docks as a wharf labourer in the 1950s.

Carruthers was married to Myra (née Hamilton) until his death and is survived by four children - Boyd, Ginna, Dimiette and Lukas.  During the 1950s he owned the colourful Bells Hotel in Sydney's Woolloomooloo.  After that he had a number of businesses, including several vegetarian takeaway and juice bars in Sydney.

In his last years Carruthers suffered from lung cancer and Parkinson's disease. He died on 15 August 1990. In 1995 he was inducted into the World Boxing Hall of Fame.

Professional boxing record

See also
List of bantamweight boxing champions

References

External links

Jimmy Carruthers - CBZ Profile

 https://titlehistories.com/boxing/wba/wba-world-b.html
 https://titlehistories.com/boxing/na/usa/ny/nysac-b.html
 https://boxrec.com/media/index.php/The_Ring_Magazine%27s_Annual_Ratings:_Bantamweight--1940s

1929 births
1990 deaths
Bantamweight boxers
Boxers from Sydney
Olympic boxers of Australia
Boxers at the 1948 Summer Olympics
Deaths from cancer in New South Wales
Commonwealth Boxing Council champions
Australian male boxers
Australian waterside workers
Sport Australia Hall of Fame inductees